is a Romanian and Moldovan traditional fried or boiled pastry.

Preparation
Papanași is doughnut-shaped with the doughnut hole on top.

Papanași dough can be fried, as a "doughnut", or boiled, as a dumpling, like large gnocchi.

Ingredients: semolina or wheat flour, urdă or ricotta or cottage cheese, rum or lemon zest or orange zest, preserves or cherries, sour cream or crème fraîche, vanilla, eggs, sugar, salt, butter, baking soda.

Etymology

References 

Romanian pastries
Moldovan cuisine
Cheese dishes